Enrique Santos Quintana (1851-1896) was an Argentine jurist and politician, who served as Minister of Justice and Public Instruction of the Argentine Republic.

Biography 
He was born in Buenos Aires, the son of Pociano Quintana and María Rito Berro, belonging to a distinguished Creole family. He was married to Clementina Mendez, daughter of Mariano Méndez and Marta Palau.
 
He did his elementary studies in the National College, and he received a Law Degree in the University of Buenos Aires. He held various political positions, including deputy and senator. In 1893, he held for a brief period the leadership of the Ministry of Public Instruction of the Argentine Nation.

His family was related to Manuel Quintana, a third or fourth cousin of Enrique Santos Quintana.

References

External links 

Defunciones 1895-1910

1851 births
1896 deaths
University of Buenos Aires alumni
Burials at La Recoleta Cemetery
Argentine politicians
People from Buenos Aires